Sylvan Friedman (May 19, 1908 – March 18, 1979) was an American politician. He served as a Democratic member of the Louisiana House of Representatives. Foshee also served as a member of the Louisiana State Senate.

Born in Natchitoches Parish, Louisiana. Friedman was the nephew of J. Isaac Friedman and Leon Friedman. He attended at the Natchitoches Central High School. Friedman served as a member of the Natchitoches Parish Police Jury from 1932 to 1944. He worked as a cowman and farmer for which he served as the president and also the vice president of the Louisiana Cattlemen's Association. Friedman also served as the operator of a general line of merchandise shop. He served as the director of the skyscraper built People's Bank and Trust Company Building. He had attended at the Soule Business College.

Friedman served as a member of the Red River Waterway Commission. In 1944, he won the election for an office of the Louisiana House of Representatives. Friedman succeeded politicians, Arthur C. Watson and John O. Williams. He served along with Numa T. Delouche. In 1948, Friedman served along with Roy Sanders. He was succeeded by Curtis Boozman and Monnie T. Cheves in 1952. In 1952, Friedman won the election for an office of the Louisiana State Senate. He succeeded Lloyd F. Wheat. Friedman served along with Cecil R. Blair since 1968. In 1972, he was succeeded by Paul Foshee for the office.

Friedman was considered a personal friend of 45th governor of Louisiana, Gerald Long. He died in March 1979 of an illness at the Natchitoches Parish Hospital in Natchitoches Parish, Louisiana, at the age of 70. Friedman was posthumously honored in the Louisiana Political Museum and Hall of Fame in 2006. He was honored in the students' union of the public Northwestern State University for which the students' union was rearranged to Friedman's name for which it was due to his politician work.

References 

1908 births
1979 deaths
People from Natchitoches Parish, Louisiana
Democratic Party Louisiana state senators
Democratic Party members of the Louisiana House of Representatives
20th-century American politicians
Businesspeople from Louisiana
20th-century American businesspeople
Farmers from Louisiana